Leende is a village in the Dutch province of North Brabant. It is located in the municipality of Heeze-Leende, approximately 12 km southeast of Eindhoven.

History 
The village was first mentioned in 1253 as Lieende. The etymology is unclear. Leende is a village which developed in the Early Middle Ages along the Groote Aa.

A church has been known to exist since 1285. The choir of St. Petrus' Banden Church dates from around 1400. The tower is from the late-15th century. The church was restored in stages during the early 20th century.

Leende was home to 1,607 people in 1840. Leende was a separate municipality until 1997, when it merged with Heeze.

Local parts 
Heeze, Leende, Leenderstrijp and Sterksel.

Neighbouring communities 
Geldrop-Mierlo, Someren, Cranendonck, Hamont-Achel, Valkenswaard, Waalre and Eindhoven.

Gallery

References

Municipalities of the Netherlands disestablished in 1997
Populated places in North Brabant
Former municipalities of North Brabant
Heeze-Leende